The Nigger of the "Narcissus": A Tale of the Forecastle (sometimes subtitled A Tale of the Sea), first published in the United States as The Children of the Sea, is an 1897 novella by Polish-British novelist Joseph Conrad. The central character is an Afro-Caribbean man who is ill at sea while aboard the trading ship Narcissus heading towards London. Controversy around the use of the word nigger in the title saw the US name changed in 1897 and a 2009 version titled The N-Word of the Narcissus.

Because of the novella's superb quality compared to Conrad's earlier works, some critics have described it as marking the start of Conrad's major or middle period; others have placed it as the best work of his early period.

Preface

Conrad's preface to the novel, regarded as a manifesto of literary impressionism, is considered one of his most significant pieces of nonfiction writing. It begins with the line: "A work that aspires, however humbly, to the condition of art should carry its justification in every line".

Plot

The title character, James Wait, is a dying West Indian black sailor on board the merchant ship Narcissus, on which he finds passage from Bombay to London. Suffering from tuberculosis, Wait becomes seriously ill almost from the outset, eliciting suspicion from much of the crew, though his ostensible plight arouses the humanitarian sympathies of many. The ship's white master, Captain Allistoun, and an old white sailor named Singleton remain concerned primarily with their duties and appear indifferent to Wait's condition. Rounding the Cape of Good Hope, the ship capsizes onto her beam-ends during a sudden gale and half her hull is submerged, with many of the crew's rations and personal belongings lost; the men cling onto the deck for an entire night and day, waiting in silence for the ship to turn over the rest of the way and sink. Allistoun refuses to allow the masts to be severed, which might allow the hull to right itself but would prevent the ship from making use of her sails. Five of the men, realizing that Wait is unaccounted for, climb down to his cabin and rescue him at their own peril. When the storm passes and a wind returns, Allistoun directs the weary men to catch the wind, which succeeds in righting the ship.

The voyage resumes but eventually drifts into the doldrums, where the head winds diminish and the ship is becalmed for many days. Rations grow even scarcer and the men become anxious to return home. Wait eventually confesses to a lazy Cockney sailor named Donkin that he is not as sick as he first claimed: that he is feigning illness to avoid having to participate in the laborious work required of every healthy seaman. Many others had already grown suspicious of him, and Captain Allistoun reveals Wait's charade before the entire crew. Wait claims he feels well enough now to work, but the captain orders that he be confined to the forecastle for the remainder of the voyage, a decision which quickly polarizes much of the crew between Wait's supporters and detractors. Allistoun prevents a near-mutiny encouraged by the conniving Donkin. Forced to stay abed, Wait grows increasingly frail as his condition deteriorates. The ship continues to drift without a breeze and some of the crew, including Singleton, begin to whisper that Wait himself is responsible, and that only his death will bring favorable winds.

As the ship passes the Azores and Wait nears death, Donkin discreetly plunders Wait's personal belongings from his sea chest. Wait eventually succumbs and dies—the first proof that he was genuinely ill. This occurs within sight of land, as Singleton had predicted, and a strong wind returns immediately after Wait's body is committed to the sea. The Narcissus soon arrives in England.

History

The work, written in 1896 and partly based on Conrad's experiences of a voyage from Bombay to Dunkirk, began as a short story but developed into a novella of some 53,000 words. As it grew, Conrad began to think of its being serialized. After Smith Elder had rejected it for the Cornhill Magazine, William Ernest Henley accepted it for the New Review, and Conrad wrote to his agent, Edward Garnett, "Now I have conquered Henley, I ain't 'fraid o' the divvle himself!" Some years later, in 1904, Conrad described this acceptance as "the first event in my writing life which really counted".

In the United States, the novel was first published under the title The Children of the Sea: A Tale of the Forecastle. The original had proven controversial in England, with one reviewer calling it "the ugliest conceivable title"; American reviewers were mixed, with one praising the new title for  "superior refinement" and another arguing it "insulted the public by imputing prudery to the American reader."

In 2009, WordBridge Publishing published a new edition with the censored title The N-Word of the Narcissus, which completely excised the word "nigger" from the text. According to the publisher, the offensive word may have led readers to avoid the book, and thus by getting rid of it the work was made more accessible to modern readers.

Analysis

The novel can be seen as an allegory about isolation and solidarity, with the ship's company serving as a microcosm of a social group. Conrad appears to suggest that humanitarian sympathies are, at their core, feelings of self-interest and that a heightened sensitivity to suffering can be detrimental to the management of a human society.

In 2006, in his critical study of Conrad, John G. Peters said of the work:

See also 
 Expurgation
Joseph Conrad's bibliography
 Nautical terms

Notes

References

Further reading

External links

 (plain text and HTML)
The Nigger of the "Narcissus" at Internet Archive and Google Books (scanned books original editions color illustrated)
 

1897 British novels
Novellas by Joseph Conrad
British novellas
Novels set on ships
Race-related controversies in literature